Htimahto is a village in the Kayin State of the southernmost part of the Myanmar.

References

External links
Satellite map at Maplandia.com

Populated places in Kayin State